Dissosteira is a genus of grasshoppers in the family Acrididae found in North America. They are about 1 to 1 1/2 inches long, and are completely grey. They can also be found in varying shades of brown.

Species
Arranged alphabetically.
 Dissosteira carolina (Linnaeus, 1758) – Carolina Grasshopper, Black-winged Grasshopper (also called Road-duster)
 Dissosteira longipennis (Thomas, 1872) – High Plains Grasshopper   
 Dissosteira pictipennis Bruner, 1905 – California Rose-Winged Grasshopper
 Dissosteira spurcata Saussure, 1884 – Spurcate Grasshopper

References
Notes

Sources
 Dissosteira, BugGuide

Acrididae genera
Oedipodinae
Taxa named by Samuel Hubbard Scudder